Mount Rixford is a  mountain summit located one mile west of the crest of the Sierra Nevada mountain range, in the southeast corner of Fresno County, in northern California. The John Muir Trail crosses Glen Pass one mile to the west of this mountain. Mt. Rixford ranks as the 183rd highest summit in California. Painted Lady is a subsidiary summit at the end of Rixford's north ridge.

History
This geographical feature was named for world-famous San Francisco surgeon Dr. Emmet Rixford (1865–1938), who made the first ascent of the summit in 1897 with two companions. As a Sierra Club explorer, he enjoyed mountaineering with companions such as the naturalist John Muir. Dr. Rixford was the president of the American Surgical Association in 1927. The mountain was named in 1899 by an ascent party from Stanford University who found Rixford's name in the summit cairn. That subsequent party was David Starr Jordan, Vernon Lyman Kellogg, Ellwood Patterson Cubberley and Mrs. Cubberley. Theirs was the third ascent of the peak, the second ascent was made by Bolton Brown in the intervening year.

Climate
According to the Köppen climate classification system, Mount Rixford is located in an alpine climate zone. Most weather fronts originate in the Pacific Ocean, and travel east toward the Sierra Nevada mountains. As fronts approach, they are forced upward by the peaks, causing them to drop their moisture in the form of rain or snowfall onto the range (orographic lift). Precipitation runoff from this peak drains into tributaries of the South Fork Kings River.

Gallery

See also

 List of mountain peaks of California

References

External links
 Weather forecast: Mount Rixford
 Emmet Rixford photo

Mountains of Fresno County, California
Mountains of Kings Canyon National Park
North American 3000 m summits
Mountains of Northern California
Sierra Nevada (United States)